A Flower Bookmark 2 is the second cover extended play by South Korean singer-songwriter IU. It is also her sixth Korean-language extended play. The EP was released on September 22, 2017 by LOEN Entertainment under its imprint FAVE Entertainment. Like her previous cover album, A Flower Bookmark features cover versions of nostalgic K-pop songs popularized from the 1960s to the 2000s.

Background and release
A Flower Bookmark 2 consists of cover versions of nostalgic K-pop songs popularized from the 1960s to the 2000s, including "Autumn Morning" (Yang Hee-eun, 1991), "Last Night Story" (Sobangcha, 1988), "Sleepless Rainy Night" (Kim Gun-mo, 1990), "Secret Garden" (Lee Tzsche, 2003), "By the Stream" (Jeong Mi-jo, 1972) and "Everyday with You" (Deulgukhwa, 1980s). It was reported that IU personally approached the artists directly to ask for permission to remake their songs.

On September 18, 2017, "Autumn Morning" was released to coincide with the singer's ninth anniversary. The rest of the tracks were digitally released four days later, along with a music video of "Last Night Story" and a special performance clip of "Sleepless Rainy Night". The physical release of the album was scheduled to be September 25, but was postponed to October 12 because the remake album was originally going to include "With the Heart to Forget You" by the late singer Kim Kwang-seok. However, due to the recent revelations surrounding his daughter's death, FAVE decided to remove the track from IU's album. On January 6, 2018, IU unveiled a music video for the song, describing it as a tribute to the late singer Kim Kwang-seok. She shared, "As a loving fan of his music, I'd like to express my respect and memory to Kim Kwang-seok with this beautiful song sung with all my sincerity."

Reception

Commercial reception
"Autumn Morning" achieved a perfect all-kill status two days after its release. The song also peaked at number one on the Gaon Digital Chart.

Critical reception

The Korea Herald said that the album lacked raw emotions, and IU's voice failed to bear the weight and complicated emotions of the originals.

Billboards review of the album was positive, explaining that "IU's latest features six cover songs that takes the vocalist’s sound into bygone decades, delving into genres like folk and nu-disco to prove her worth as one of South Korea’s most formidable songstresses."

The 405 says that "isn't content to just mimic her childhood favorites, these are classic Korean songs completely re-imagined and recreated to into something undeniably 'IU'."

Track listing

Charts

Year-end charts

Singles

"Autumn Morning "

Year-end charts

"Sleepless Rainy Night "

Sales

References

2017 EPs
IU (singer) EPs
Covers EPs
Kakao M EPs
Korean-language EPs